Inga extra-nodis is a species of plant in the family Fabaceae. It is found only in Ecuador. Its natural habitat is subtropical or tropical moist montane forests.

References

extra-nodis
Flora of Ecuador
Vulnerable plants
Taxonomy articles created by Polbot